"Somewhere Else" is a song by English indie rock band Razorlight, and was featured as a bonus track on the 2005 re-release of their debut album, Up All Night. It was their first new material following that album and became their biggest hit to date in the United Kingdom at the time when released as a single, debuting at number two in the UK Singles Chart, only to be bettered by "America", which charted at number one in October 2006. In 2007, the lyrics: "and I met a girl/She asked me my name/I told her what it was", were voted the third-worst lyrics of all time.

Music video
The video features Johnny Borrell walking around various place in London, before returning to where he started at the beginning. A large portion of the video was filmed inside and outside the Northumberland Arms pub.

Track listings

UK 7-inch single
A. "Somewhere Else"
B. "Dub the Right Profile"

UK CD1
 "Somewhere Else"
 "Keep the Right Profile"

UK CD2
 "Somewhere Else"
 "Hang By, Hang By"
 "Up All Night" (live in California)
 Enhanced section: link to download five free live tracks

Charts

Weekly charts

Year-end charts

Certifications

Release history

References

2004 songs
2005 singles
Razorlight songs
Songs written by Johnny Borrell
Universal Records singles
Vertigo Records singles